Djimadoum Tiraina is a politician from Chad who is current Vice President of Chad after death of the Idriss Déby President of Chad and Minister of Armed Forces. He is also the Vice President of Transitional Military Council.

References 

Living people
Year of birth missing (living people)
Chadian politicians